The men's Greco-Roman 120 kilograms is a competition featured at the 2011 World Wrestling Championships, and was held at the Sinan Erdem Dome in Istanbul, Turkey on 13 September 2011.

Results
Legend
F — Won by fall

Finals

Top half

Section 1

Section 2

Bottom half

Section 3

Section 4

Repechage

References
Results Book, Pages 101–102

Men's Greco-Roman 120 kg